Thirteen ships of the French Navy have borne the name Naïade:

 , a light frigate that took part in the Battle of Texel on 21 August 1673.
 , a 34-gun frigate.
 , a 10-gun corvette.
 , a 20-gun  corvette. 
 , a 16-gun brig launched in 1793 and captured by the Royal Navy in 1805 who renamed her HMS Melville. She was sold for breaking up in 1808.
 , a 20-gun corvette, ceded to Holland in 1814 as Eendracht. 
 , a 24-gun corvette that took part in the Battle of Veracruz in 1838. 
 , (1881) a 3,500-tonne wooden frigate launched in 1881. 
 , a  launched in 1904 and stricken in 1914.
 , a  launched in 1925 and scuttled in 1942, subsequently salvaged and sunk in 1943.
 , a boat of the diving school of the French Navy
 , a transport used to ferry personnel between Toulon and Levant Island. (Y702)

Citations

Bibliography
 

French Navy ship names